Jawad Jabber Sadkhan is a citizen of Iraq who was held in extrajudicial detention in the United States Guantanamo Bay detainment camps, in Cuba.
Sadkhan's Guantanamo Internment Serial Number was 433.

Jawad's lawyers dispute that Jawad should have been held a single day, because he was a political refugee from Iraq and a Shi'a Muslim – whereas the Taliban and al-Qaeda were Sunni Muslims.

Identity
Captive number 433 wrote a letter on behalf of Abbas Habid Rumi Al Naely, to his Administrative Review Board.  He signed himself Abu Fatima Al Iraqi.

Combatant Status Review Tribunal

Initially the Bush administration asserted that they could withhold all the protections of the Geneva Conventions to captives from the war on terror.  This policy was challenged before the Judicial branch. Critics argued that the USA could not evade its obligation to conduct competent tribunals to determine whether captives are, or are not, entitled to the protections of prisoner of war status.

Subsequently the Department of Defense instituted the Combatant Status Review Tribunals.  The Tribunals, however, were not authorized to determine whether the captives were lawful combatants—rather they were merely empowered to make a recommendation as to whether the captive had previously been correctly determined to match the Bush administration's definition of an enemy combatant.

Sadkhan chose to participate in his Combatant Status Review Tribunal.

Witness and evidence requests
Sadkhan made requests for the testimony of three off-Island witnesses, on his behalf.
He requested a document from an Afghan police station.
And he requested a United Nations document that he knew should already have been in the Guantanamo evidence locker, because his interrogators had it in their possession during his interrogations.  UN officials had issued him this document in 1998.

Sadkhan's Tribunal's President informed him that requests were made, through the US State Department, 
on November 9, 2004, November 22, 2004, and November 30, 2004.  
There was no reply, so, the witnesses were ruled "not reasonably available".

Sadkhan's Personal Representative informed him he could not locate the documents he had seen in the possession of his interrogators.

Sadkhan's Tribunal's President informed him that a fourth witness, who was also a Guantanamo captive, had been contacted, and had declined to testify on his behalf.

Sadkhan told the Tribunal that this witness had agreed to testify and explain about the animosity between Shiite and Sunni Muslims in Afghanistan. Sadkhan said he was a Shiite.

Allegations

Witness detainee 758

Sadkhan had a statement from detainee 758 submitted as evidence at his Tribunal.
In his statement detainee 758 identified himself as "Shaker Al Iraqi (Abass Abdou Erromi)".  

The official record identifies him as Abbas Habid Rumi Al Naely.

He testified that he suspected the accusation against him and detainee 433 were the result of animosity from detainee 111, Ali Abdul Motalib Awayd Hassan Al Tayeea.
who he identified as "Ali Abdou Ahtaleb Al Iraqi" and detainee 252, who he identified as "Yassin Basro Al Yamani".

The official record shows detainees 111 and 262 as Ali Abdul Motalib Awayd Hassan Al Tayeea and Yasim Muhammed Basardah.

Al Naely says he knew Sadkhan in Afghanistan, and he knew him as a good, peaceloving, family man.  Al Naely said that the two men he identified as Sadkhan's accusers did not know him in Afghanistan, and their accusations were complete fabrications.

Jowad Jabar v. George W. Bush

A petition of habeas corpus, Jowad Jabar v. George W. Bush was filed on Jowad Jabar's
behalf.
In response, on 22 December 2005
the Department of Defense published a dossier of 24
pages of unclassified documents from his Tribunal.

In September 2007, the Department of Defense published the unclassified dossiers arising from the Combatant Status Review Tribunals of 179 captives.

The documents record Captive 433 requested witnesses.  However different documents in his dossier state he requested two, three, four, and five witnesses.

Tribunal panel 19 convened on 2004-12-03 and confirmed his enemy combatant status.

Administrative Review Board hearings

Detainees who were determined to have been properly classified as "enemy combatants" were scheduled to have their dossier reviewed at annual Administrative Review Board hearings.  The Administrative Review Boards weren't authorized to review whether a detainee qualified for POW status, and they weren't authorized to review whether a detainee should have been classified as an "enemy combatant".

They were authorized to consider whether a detainee should continue to be detained by the United States, because they continued to pose a threat—or whether they could safely be repatriated to the custody of their home country, or whether they could be set free.

First annual Administrative Review Board hearing

A Summary of Evidence memo was prepared for his first annual Administrative Review Board.

Transcript

Sadkhan chose to participate in his Administrative Review Board hearing.

Second annual Administrative Review Board hearing

A Summary of Evidence memo was prepared for his second annual Administrative Review Board, on 5 September 2006.

Letter of testimonial for Abbas Habid Rumi Al Naely

Sackhan wrote a letter for Abbas Habid Rumi Al Naely, an Iraqi refugee.  Sadkhan's letter confirmed Al Naely's account that he had to rely on charity during his time in Afghanistan.  

I know this man from Afghanistan when he visited me in my own home begging me for some help.  I did not have anything to offer [him].  But when I looked at his overall look and his dirty clothing he had on, he looked so miserable.  So I went to another friend of mine and asked him for money.  That person gave me about $3 and I gave it to ISN 758.  I have invited him to stay at my house for that particular night, but he refused.  This person came back to me again (meaning ISN 758) asking me for more money that I didn't have to give him.  I also learned from other people that this person was addicted to Hash, he smokes grass.  This was a reason that made me decide not to help him because every time I would help him he would spend it on Hash.  To me he was not a political person, a religious person, or a military person.  I have never heard once that he hated America or  allies.  I never heard that he really served with the Taliban.  He received some help from the Taliban like other Iraqi refugees, and I am one of them.  I am one of them and I have received help from the Taliban.  They only gave me food for my family and me.  They gave me a house to stay with my family.  In regards to 758, they did not give him a house because he was not married.  They only gave [one] to me.  He is a peaceful man and he does not pose a threat on nobody and he has parents that need him.  Anything that happened between him and me, like some kind of animosity was a result of the investigators here on this facility.  So they can create animosity between the two of use .  I was exposed to a lot of abuse, psychological abuse from the investigators and God only knows what happened.  This person ISN 758 is innocent from any allegations and God knows everything.  This is what I have and peace be upon [you].

Military Commissions Act

The Military Commissions Act of 2006 mandated that Guantanamo captives were no longer entitled to access the US civil justice system, so all outstanding habeas corpus petitions were stayed.

Boumediene v. Bush

On June 12, 2008, the United States Supreme Court ruled, in Boumediene v. Bush, that the Military Commissions Act could not remove the right for Guantanamo captives to access the US Federal Court system.  And all previous Guantanamo captives' habeas petitions were eligible to be re-instated.
The judges considering the captives' habeas petitions would be considering whether the evidence used to compile the allegations the men and boys were enemy combatants justified a classification of "enemy combatant".

On July 9, 2008, Jeffrey D. Colman of JENNER & BLOCK LLP submitted a "RESPONSE OF PETITIONER JAWAD JABBAR SADKHAN AL-SAHLANI, ISN NO. 433, TO ISSUES RAISED AT JULY 8, 2008 HEARING" in Civil Action No. 05-CV-1497 (RCL) on behalf of Jawad Jabbar Sadkhan Al-Sahlani (ISN 433).

On July 18, 2008, Jeffrey D. Colman renewed Jawad's petition, noting that he is an Iraqi Shiite Muslim.
Colman noted he is a Shiite Muslim from Iraq and that he is married and the father of four children, approximately ages 11, 9, 8, and 6.

On October 31, 2008, Jeffrey D. Colman filed a Petitioner's Opposition to Respondent's Motion for Leave to File Amended Factual Return on behalf of Jawad Jabbar Sadkhan Al-Sahlani (ISN 433) in Civil Action No. 05-CV-2384 (RWR). Colman described the Department of Justice's attorneys were acting in bad faith.

Repatriation

On June 11, 2009, Sadkhan was transferred from Guantanmo Bay to Iraq.

Following his repatriation to Iraqi custody, in a profile of his lawyer, Jeffrey Colman, AM Law provided more details of Jawad's repatriation.  
According to the article, Jawad was first cleared for release in 2003.  According to the article Colman was informed that the Obama review team cleared him for release on May 15, 2009.

References

External links
 Refuting Cheney’s Lies: The Stories of Six Prisoners Released from Guantánamo Andy Worthington
 The Last Iraqi In Guantánamo, Cleared Six Years Ago, Returns Home Andy Worthington

Living people
Year of birth missing (living people)
Guantanamo detainees known to have been released